Łazisko may refer to the following places in Poland:
Łazisko, Lower Silesian Voivodeship (south-west Poland)
Łazisko, Łódź Voivodeship (central Poland)